Jateorhiza palmata (calumba) is a perennial climbing plant from East Africa. It contains isoquinoline alkaloids and is used mainly as a bitter tonic especially in cases of anorexia nervosa. It contains no tannins, hence it can be safely used in iron preparations for the treatment of anaemia without the fear of precipitation resulted from in vitro interaction.

Description
Tall, dioecious twining perennial vine; often reaching the tops of trees. The annual stems, one or two from each root, are hair with glandular tips and have large bright green membranous leaves which are palmate, alternate and long petioled. The flowers are insignificant and greenish white. The female flower is followed by moon-shaped stone in a drupe. Transverse section yellowish, outside greyish brown. Taste is muscilagenous and very bitter.

References

External links
 

Menispermaceae
Flora of Africa
Plants described in 1797